On December 1, 2022, Jeremy Skibicki was charged for the murders of four Indigenous Canadian women: Rebecca Contois, Morgan Harris, Marcedes Myran, and an unidentified woman referred to as the Buffalo Woman. The murders were thought to have been committed between the months of March and May 2022. 

Investigations by CBC News revealed that Skibicki had a pattern of spousal abuse, with two previous partners having been allegedly assaulted, threatened, and raped by Skibicki. Both partners were of Indigenous (Métis) descent. Further investigations of Skibicki's Facebook revealed a pattern of far-right, misogynistic, violent, anti-semitic, and white supremacist behaviour.

Victims
Four individuals are thought to have been victims of Skibicki. Three of the four were Indigenous women, and the fourth individual is thought to additionally be of Indigenous ancestry. Family members of several of the women stated that they were experiencing homelessness at the time.

Rebecca Contois was a member of the O-Chi-Chak-Ko-Sipi First Nation and lived in Winnipeg at the time. She was 24 years old.

Morgan Beatrice Harris was a member of the Long Plain First Nation and lived in Winnipeg at the time. She was 39 years old. Harris was last seen in the area of Winnipeg's Main Street and Henry Avenue.

Marcedes Myran was a member of the Long Plain First Nation and lived in Winnipeg at the time. She was 26 years old. Myran was last seen in the North End neighborhood of Winnipeg.

Mashkode Bizhiki'ikwe/Buffalo Woman was an unidentified woman of possible Indigenous descent. She was thought to be in her mid twenties and living in Winnipeg at the time. She was previously referred to as "Jane Doe" or as an unidentified victim, but discussions among advocates and Indigenous elders led to the adoption of the name "Buffalo Woman", which the Winnipeg police adopted. The name was given to refer to the buffalo spirit which gave her name to individuals who had not received a spirit name in order to know one another, and allow for the acknowledgement of Buffalo Woman by the spirit realm. Buffalo Woman was thought to have worn a Baby Phat brand reversible brand jacket with a fur hood.

Alleged perpetrator
Jeremy Anthony Micheal Skibicki is currently charged with four counts of first-degree murder for the killings of Contois, Myran, Harris, and Buffalo Woman. A representative for Skibicki stated that his client would plead not guilty.

Skibicki has a documented history of alleged abuse against his partners. In June 2015, Skibicki was convicted following the assault of his common-law partner. The woman, who was pregnant at the time, was strangled by Skibicki and was punched repeatedly in the face. Skibicki threatened to kill the woman if she attempted to call the police, the woman filed for a protection order but the order was dismissed. Skibicki allegedly expressed violent fantasies towards his previous partner, and had smothered his partner so hard that her teeth began bleeding. He was sentenced to two months in prison and two years probation for the assault. In 2019, Skibicki's then-wife filed a protection order against him at their first wedding anniversary. In 2021, Skibicki was charged with disobeying court orders, threatening her, and assaulting her with a deadly weapon. Skibicki's then-wife was told by him that he would kill, torture, traffick, or abduct her. Skibicki had alleged that she was abused by her husband, including having been raped by him while she was asleep and suffocation by a pillow. Earlier in May of 2022, his then-wife filed paperwork for a divorce. Another assault charge against him, for allegedly attacking his spouse, was stayed. Both of Skibicki's previous partners were Indigenous, and were of Métis descent.

Following an investigation by CBC News, it was found that Skibicki's personal Facebook page contained violent material, in addition to antisemitic, misogynistic, and white supremacist material. Skibicki described himself as a member of "Holy Europe", the "Alliance of Patriotic Parallel Movements of European Folks" (APPMEF), a far-right organization which promotes the belief that white Europeans need to preserve their bloodlines from being diluted by race-mixing, multiculturalism, and immigration.

Timeline
The killings were committed between the months of March and May 2022. Police believe the Buffalo Woman was killed on March 15, 2022.

Investigators believe that Harris was killed on May 1, 2022, the day she was last seen alive.

Police suspect that Myran was killed on May 4, 2022.

On May 16, 2022, Rebecca Contois' partial remains were found in a garbage bin near an apartment complex in Winnipeg's North Kildonan neighborhood. In the ensuing search on June 2, 2022, further remains of Contois were found at the Brady Road Landfill. Skibicki was charged by authorities on May 18, 2022 for the killing of Contois.

On May 24, 2022 authorities issued an alert asking for help in finding Harris.

On December 1, 2022, police announced that Skibicki was charged with three counts of first degree murder for the additional killings of Harris, Myran, and Buffalo Woman. Skibicki appeared in court on December 2, 2022, his case would go directly to trial without holding a preliminary hearing.

Investigation
Authorities discovered Contois' body on May 16, 2022 in a "horrifically grisly scene" in garbage bins behind Mar Joy Apartments in North Kildonan, Winnipeg. It was believed that as part of the residential pickup, Contois' remains would be placed in the Brady Road landfill.

Authorities began searching the Brady Road landfill for Contois' remains on June 2, 2022 following the lighting of a sacred fire. They were joined by authorities from the Ka Ni Kanichihk's Medicine Bear Counselling Program and the Manitoba Keewatinowi Okimakanak's missing, murdered and Indigenous women and girls liaison unit. Contois' remains were found in June of 2022.

Reactions

Law enforcement
Winnipeg Police Chief Danny Smyth stated in a press conference that it was unsettling whenever there is any kind of serial killing, highlighting that the women were Indigenous and stating "We’re very sensitive to the whole missing and murdered Indigenous women investigation and inquiry and the recommendations that came out of that."

Government reactions
Winnipeg mayor Scott Gillingham stated "condolences are not strong enough" and that the women were "members of our community ... someone's daughter, someone's sister, someone's mother, someone's friend" in a press conference that there was much more work to be done in protecting Indigenous women and girls, highlighting the vulnerability caused by homelessness, addiction, and poverty.

Members of Parliament Leah Gazan (Winnipeg Centre) and Niki Ashton (Churchill—Keewatinook Aski) proposed an emergency debate in the House of Commons of Canada on the issue of MMIWG2S+ and called for further resources to support vulnerable women following the revelation Skibicki had allegedly killed multiple Indigenous women. The request for a debate was not granted. Gazan stated: "While the government stalls in providing resources, Indigenous women and girls and two-spirit continue to be murdered." Gazan pressed the Minister of Crown–Indigenous Relations Marc Miller on the decision by the Winnipeg police not to search the Brady Road landfill for the bodies of the three missing Indigenous women, of which Miller remarked that he found the decision "very puzzling". Miller stated his intention to meet with Harris's family, while Gazan met with the families of Harris and Wilson, along with other Indigenous leaders, in a press conference.

MLA for Point Douglas Bernadette Smith, whose sister went missing in 2008, supported the decision to refer to one of the victims as "Buffalo Woman". Smith attended a vigil for missing and murdered Indigenous women held following the announcement of further victims. Shadow Justice Minister Nahanni Fontaine expressed on her twitter that community members were feeling "rage, despair, disgust and unspeakable sadness" following the arrest of Skibicki, who she described as a "monster". Fontaine asked "When will the protection of Indigenous women, girls and two-spirited be taken seriously? Winnipeg now has the distinction of having two separate serial killers of Indigenous women. Are we waiting for a third or fourth to rear their murderous heads?"

Indigenous leaders
Grand Chief Jerry Daniels of the Southern Chiefs' Organization, which represents two of the reserves that the victims were from, stated: “We will be keeping you in our thoughts and prayers as you grapple with the news that your loved ones have been taken from us in such a violent way.”

Kyra Wilson, Chief of the Long Plain First Nation, where Harris and Myran were from, called for further support for Indigenous women, two-spirit, and gender diverse individuals, in addition to support due to the deaths of two community members. Wilson highlighted the disproportionate violence committed towards Indigenous women for many generations.

The Assembly of First Nations, which was holding a special chief's assembly in Ottawa, held a moment of silence in honour of the victims and their families on December 6, 2022.

Community reactions
A candlelight vigil was held outside of Skibicki's home on December 1, 2022 for individuals grieving the loss of the women and other loved ones.

See also
Gilbert Paul Jordan
Highway of Tears
List of solved missing person cases
Missing and murdered Indigenous women
Robert Pickton

References

2020s in Winnipeg
2020s missing person cases
Far-right politics in Canada
Formerly missing people
Hate crimes
Incidents of violence against women
Missing and Murdered Indigenous Women and Girls movement
Missing person cases in Canada
Murder in Manitoba
Violence against Indigenous women in Canada
Women in Manitoba